Ogle County Airport  is a public use airport located two nautical miles (2.3 mi, 3.7 km) southeast of the central business district of Mount Morris, a village in Ogle County, Illinois, United States. The airport is privately owned by Ogle County Pilots Inc.

Facilities and aircraft 
It has one runway, designated 9/27, with a turf surface measuring 2,640 by 200 feet (805 x 61 m).

For the 12-month period ending July 31, 2019, the airport had roughly 6,500 general aviation aircraft operations, an average of 17 per day. Operations consisted entirely of general aviation traffic. At that time there were 14 aircraft based at this airport: 93% single-engine and 7% ultralight.

References

External links 
 Aerial photo as of 8 April 1999 from USGS The National Map

Airports in Illinois
Buildings and structures in Ogle County, Illinois